Ivan Valant (born 21 October 1909, died 1999) was a Yugoslav cyclist. He competed in the individual and team road race events at the 1936 Summer Olympics.

References

External links
 

1909 births
Year of death missing
Yugoslav male cyclists
Olympic cyclists of Yugoslavia
Cyclists at the 1936 Summer Olympics
Sportspeople from Ljubljana
Slovenian male cyclists